Urbacodon ("URBAC tooth") is a genus of troodontid dinosaur, a type of small carnivore.  It lived in Uzbekistan during the early Late Cretaceous Period, about 95 million years ago.

On 9 September 2004, a lower jaw of a small theropod was uncovered by Anton Sergeevich Rezwiy near Itemir in the IT-01 quarry.

The type species, Urbacodon itemirensis, was named by Alexandr Averianov and Hans-Dieter Sues in 2007. The first part of the generic name Urbacodon is an acronym, honouring the Uzbek, Russian, British, American and Canadian scientists who participated in its discovery. This acronym was combined with a Greek ὀδών, odon, "tooth". The specific name refers to the provenance from Itemir.

The name was based on the holotype ZIN PH 944/16, a single left dentary with preserved replacement teeth from the Cenomanian Dzharakuduk Formation. Averianov and Sues also identified teeth and other material, earlier described by Lev Nesov, as a Urbacodon sp. from the nearby Turonian Bissekty Formation.

The holotype dentary of U. itemirensis is 79.2 millimetres long (3.12 in) and has 32 tooth positions. It is rather straight in top view. The teeth are closely packed but between the front twenty-four teeth and the rear eight teeth, a distinctive gap is present, a diastema. This is a unique trait but was not formally designated as an autapomorphy because it might be the result of individual variation. Urbacodon resembles Byronosaurus and Mei but differs from most other Troodontidae in that its teeth lack serrations. Urbacodon is distinguished from Byronosaurus by a less vascularized lateral dentary groove and more bulbous anterior tooth crowns, and from Mei by considerably larger size.

Averianov and Sues viewed Urbacodon as more plesiomorphic than Troodon and Saurornithoides in having a straight dentary with fewer teeth, but did not attempt to place it on a cladogram. In 2010, a cladistic analysis showed it as a close relative of Byronosaurus and Xixiasaurus.

See also
 Timeline of troodontid research

References

Troodontids
Turonian life
Late Cretaceous dinosaurs of Asia
Fossils of Uzbekistan
Bissekty Formation
Fossil taxa described in 2007
Taxa named by Hans-Dieter Sues